Chhota Bheem and the Throne of Bali is a 2013 Indian animated film written and directed by Rajiv Chilaka and produced by Chilaka and Samir Jain. The film is based on the Indian animated series Chhota Bheem. It is the sixteenth instalment in the Chhota Bheem film series and the second film in the series to be released directly to movie theatres. Distributed by Yash Raj Films, it was released in four different languages (English, Hindi, Tamil, and Telugu). It received mixed reviews. This movie had its television premiere on Hungama TV on July 17, 2013, was released in the United States on February 1, 2014, and was shown on Pogo TV on January 30, 2021. It was voted best animated feature film of 2013 by IBNLive.

Production 

The animated series Chhota Bheem launched in 2008. Due to its success, Green Gold Animation, an Indian animation content producer associated with PVR Pictures, released its first full-length movie, Chhota Bheem and the Curse of Damyaan. That movie was a surprise success at the Indian box office. This movie was also directed by Rajiv Chilaka, with Yash Raj Films distributing the film. 

The film was produced in the summer, of 2010, while the prequels Chhota Bheem and the Curse Of Damyaan and Chhota Bheem: Master of Shaolin were still in theaters. Chilaka read a newspaper article about Bali and was inspired to create another full-length movie with Green Gold Animation. He began to work on the movie on August 17, 2010, and it was released on May 3, 2013.

Characters

Regular characters 
 Bheem—hero of the film.
 Chutki—a nine-year-old girl, friend of Bheem.
 Indumati—a nine-year-old girl, the young princess of Dholakpur.
 Raju— a five-year-old boy, friend of Bheem.
 Indravarma—king of Dholakpur.
 Jaggu—a talking monkey and Bheem's friend.
 Kalia—a twelve-year-old boy and friend of Bheem.
 Dholu and Bholu—identical twin brothers, followers of Kalia.

Film-specific characters 
 Arjun—a 9-year-old boy, Indravarma's maternal nephew, and the young Prince of Bali.

 Rangda—an evil witch, captures Bali.

 Rajguru Bahula—a scholar of Bali.
 Balian—priest of Bali.

 Leyak—minion of rangda.

 Barong—the supreme god of Bali.

 Aci and Ayu—two Indonesian village girls.

 Mukhiyaji-Sarpanch of a village in Bali and father of Aci and Ayu.

Music

Release and reception 

The film was distributed by Yash Raj Films and released to 400 screens on May 3, 2013.

It received mixed reviews from critics. The Times of India reviewer found the animation quality of the film far better than that of other contemporary Indian works and appreciated the simple storytelling in the film. Sify, in their review, found the film "critic-proof" and gave it 3 out of 5 stars. 123telugu.com commented that the second half of the film was slower in comparison to the first, but that Arjun's character was well-portrayed. They also gave the movie 3 out of 5 stars.

Box office 
The film was successful at the box office, earning 25 crore rupees in the first week, and 36 crores after the second week. , the film has earned 116 crores worldwide.

See also
Indian animation industry
List of Indian animated feature films

References

External links 
 
 

Indian animated films
2013 animated films
2013 films
Animated films based on animated series
Films based on television series
Chhota Bheem
Films distributed by Yash Raj Films
Indian children's films
Indian animated fantasy films